The British Railway Stories (formerly The British Railway Series) is a series of books and films written and filmed by Simon A.C. Martin and illustrated by railway artist Dean Walker. The books were written as a way of educating children about the railways of Britain towards the end of steam locomotion.

There have been 18 episodes of The British Railway Series published to YouTube, but creator Simon Martin has stated numerous times that he was unhappy with the original story arc and filming techniques.

As of 2020, only one book has currently been published. Tale of the Unnamed Engine, tells the story of "W.P. Allen", an LNER Peppercorn Class A1 locomotive 'earning his stripes' as a brand new express passenger locomotive. The book also features a plot device seemingly missing from the YouTube episodes, with Stephen the Holden B12 locomotive serving as the narrator (a device that Martin has stated was his original intention). In September 2021, Simon Martin announced that the British Railway Stories will be published by Strathwood Publishing Limited, which will include a new book in the series titled Great Western Glory.

Story
The British Railway Series: The End of the LNER revolves around the engines who live at Copley Hill engine shed in Leeds on the Eastern Region of British Railways. Set in the 1950s/1960s, the series mainly focuses on three characters: Allen the A1 Peppercorn, Stephen the Holden B12 and Sir Ralph the A4 Pacific. Since Goodbye Stephen The Green Engine, diesels have begun to replace the steam engines on the railway as part of the Modernisation Plan. In later episodes, this has been a major part of the series, as the engines become worried about who will be scrapped first.

Episodes
1. A Great Problem Goes West: A visiting engine from the Western Region of British Railways runs into difficulty with a goods train, and when Allen attempts to return him home things go wrong when the old engine derails, and gets left behind.

2. Veto A V2: When Herbert the V2 first arrives at the shed after being repaired, Sir Ralph finds it very difficult to come accustomed to him.

3. Hawk, Aye!: During Sir Ralph's repairs, a Great Western shunting engine called Hawk arrives in the yard to shunt a re-arrangement of duties.

4. Nigel, Herbert & the Cows: A new shunting engine called Nigel upsets an unknowing Herbert through his working practices - taking this to be ignorant, Herbert thinks that Nigel doesn't like him...

5. Hand of the Fair Maid: There's rivalry in the air when Sir Ralph and Allen are competing to pull the new express: The Fair Maid!

6. Goodbye Stephen The Green Engine: When Stephen has an accident, the engines of the yard realise the value of a good engine, and a good friend.

7. Christmas, 1952: The importance of clearing snow is made clear to both Sir Ralph and Tavish.

8. Scott & The Herring Gull: Sir Ralph's secret comes closer and closer to unravelling when Scott the A3 Pacific arrives at Copley Hill.

9. Birds Of A Feather: After a misunderstanding with headcodes, Scott decides to reveal Sir Ralph's true infamy.

10. The Legacy Of Gadwall: Stephen tells the other engines in the shed the story of how Sir Ralph got his name in a feature-length episode of British Railway Series, shown largely in black and white.

11. Hawk Eyed!: The beginning of the Age of Dieselisation doesn't go entirely well when Hawk and Gronk had trouble with the shunting!

12. Hawk The Hunter: Hawk turns super-sleuth when strange happenings in the yard give him cause for concern - and reason to give chase!

13. Suburban Tank: Nigel the V3 Tank engine enjoys his stopping trains. But as Nigel falls ill, can Herbert take the strain - and will the V3 be okay?

14. Silent Night: When Nigel wakes up on the "Out of Use" line the engines begin to wonder whether the V3 Tank Engine will be scrapped.

15. Day of the Deltic: The true extent of Dieselisation is felt when a large blue Deltic arrives at Copley Hill and causes trouble for the steam engines, while Stephen delivers a stark warning at the end... he's seen "The List"...

15X. Parting Of Ways: It is the parting of ways... Stephen saves Hawk from the scrapman, and helps Gronk with his rehabilitation at Leeds Central.

16. Great Scott!: Scott the A3 Pacific is fed up of being "just another engine", and wants to go back to the heyday of his career. Stephen tells the other engines a short story about Scott's true greatness.

17. Fowler's Ghost (episode): It is Hallows Eve, and Stephen is telling some ghost stories to the other engines, including the tale of a steam engine, scorned by its builder, left to rust, and plotting its revenge.

17X. The Ghosts of Engines Past:  A tank engine comes to the yard, and tells the tale of the first engine to be privately preserved from British Railways. Meanwhile, Stephen comes to terms with the news that he is now the last of his kind.

18. The Last Run: The heart rending final of The Original British Railway Stories. Allen the A1 Pacific recounts his final tale... including his last run to King's Cross.

Cancelled/unreleased episodes
Tale Of The Tay: An episode cancelled from The British Railway Series. Tavish is ignored by attempted stories of his being interrupted such as Fowler's Ghost, but goes to Dundee Tay Bridge MPD in 1960 to tell the others there about the tale of the tragic Tay Bridge collapse on 28 December 1879.
Tornado and the Last Run to the Cross: The final episode set for The British Railway Series: The End of the LNER (second format). 
It is unknown whether the episode is either set for a re-launch or cancelled.

Railway characters

Main
 Allen, the A1 Peppercorn
 Stephen, the Holden B12
 Sir Ralph, the A4 Pacific
 Herbert, the V2 2-6-2
 Nigel, the V3 Tank engine
 Tavish, the LNER J39 from Scotland
 Scott, the A3 Pacific/  Flying Scotsman

Others
 Tornado, the engine that appeared in some episodes due to the author's objections
 Deltic, the BR English Electric Prototype
 Jerry, the Standard 4 Class 4-6-0
 Fowler's Ghost (engine), the Fireless board gauge 2-4-0 (Depicted as a 2-2-2 in the story of Fowler's Ghost (episode))
 Charlotte, the LNER Class K3
 Violet, the GNR Class N2
 Falcon, the Class 53 Diesel
 Thompson, the LNER Class B1
 Wensley, the LNER Class J72
 Clan Stewart, the Standard 6P Clan
 George, the LMS Ivatt Class 2 2-6-2T
 Gulliver, the GWR Class 1400
 Arthur, the A2 Peppercorn
 Samson, the LMS 7P Royal Scot
 Alf, the GNR Class J13/LNER Class J52
 Gian, the BR Class 26
 Jackson, the GWR 4300 Class
 Holden, the NBR J83 Class
 Brush, the BR Class 47
 Gronk, the BR Class 08
 Harry, the GER B12/3
 Claud Hamilton, the GER D16/3
 Hugh, the LNER N2, same locomotive class as Violet
 King George VI, the GWR 6000 Class
 Hawksworth or Hawk for short the GWR 9400 Class

External links
 The British Railway Stories LTD

Series of children's books
Novels set on trains